Fuzhounan (Fuzhou South) Railway Station is a metro station and a railway station located in Cangshan District, Fuzhou, Fujian Province, China, along the Wenzhou–Fuzhou railway and Fuzhou–Xiamen railway operated by the CR Nanchang, China Railway Corporation.

History
The station began construction on September2, 2008 and opened on April26, 2010. The station is undergoing expansion to accommodate the under construction Fuzhou–Xiamen high-speed railway.

Services

China Railway

Fuzhounan railway station is a railway station in Cangshan District, Fuzhou, Fujian, China.

This station is being expanded to accommodate the Fuzhou–Xiamen high-speed railway. The work is expected to be completed in 2022.

Fuzhou Metro

Fuzhou South Railway Station is a metro station of Line 1 of the Fuzhou Metro. It is located on Lulei Road at the underground of CR railway station in Cangshan District, Fuzhou, Fujian, China. This station started operation on May 18, 2016.

Station Layout

Exits

See also
Fuzhou Metro
Fuzhou Railway Station

References

Railway stations in Fujian
Railway stations in China opened in 2010
Buildings and structures in Fuzhou
Transport in Fuzhou
Fuzhou Metro stations